This article lists the squads for the 2020 Turkish Women's Cup, the 3rd edition of the Turkish Women's Cup. The cup consisted of a series of friendly games, and was held in Turkey from 4 to 10 March 2020. The eight national teams and one domestic team involved in the tournament registered a squad of 23 players.

The age listed for each player is on 4 March 2020, the first day of the tournament. The numbers of caps and goals listed for each player do not include any matches played after the start of tournament. The club listed is the club for which the player last played a competitive match prior to the tournament. The nationality for each club reflects the national association (not the league) to which the club is affiliated. A flag is included for coaches that are of a different nationality than their own national team.

Squads

Belarus
Coach: Yury Maleyew

Belarus played only one match against Romania. This was their squad.

Chile
Coach: José Letelier

The squad was announced on 26 February 2020.

Ghana
Coach: Mercy Tagoe

The squad was announced on 29 February 2020.

Hong Kong
Coach:  Ricardo

The squad was announced on 20 February 2020.

Hungary
Coach: Edina Markó

The squad was announced on 20 February 2020.

BIIK Kazygurt
Coach:  Kaloyan Petkov

Kenya
Coach: David Ouma

The squad was announced on 2 March 2020.

Northern Ireland U-19
Coach: Alfie Wylie

The squad was announced on 1 March 2020.

Romania
Coach: Mirel Albon

The squad was announced on 26 February 2020. Andreea Părăluță was injured during training before the second match and withdrew from the squad, being replaced by Mirela Ganea.

Venezuela
Coach:  Pamela Conti

The squad was announced on 17 February 2020. Venezuela later withdrew from the competition before its beginning and was replaced by Belarus and BIIK Kazygurt.

Player representation
The information represents only the eight national teams taking part in the competition.

By club
Clubs with 4 or more players represented are listed.

By club nationality

By club federation

By representatives of domestic league

References

2020